The Drăgoteni is a right tributary of the river Valea Roșie in Romania. It flows into the Valea Roșie near Pocola.

References

Rivers of Romania
Rivers of Bihor County